Steven Eugene Grove (born November 27, 1962), better known as Euge Groove, is an American  smooth jazz saxophonist.

Early life and career
Born in Hagerstown, Maryland, he graduated from the University of Miami School of Music in 1984. Grove did not record his first solo album until 2000.  Prior to that, he had replaced Richard Elliot in the Tower of Power when Elliot decided to pursue a solo career, and he also did session work with various pop acts, most noticeably the Miami girl group Exposé.  He has a sax solo on their No. 1 hit "Seasons Change," and another on their 1993 hit "I'll Never Get Over You (Getting Over Me)."

Grove adopted the name Euge Groove; initially presumed to be coined by fans who saw him perform in Europe, Grove later indicated in an interview on XM Radio in 2006 that his mother-in-law conceived the idea for his stage name.

Euge Groove's best-known solo hits include "Sneak a Peek," "Slam Dunk," "Rewind," "Don't Let Me Be Lonely Tonight," "Livin' Large" and "XXL."  His most recent hits include "Get 'Em Going", "Chillaxin', and "S7ven Large". Albums include: S7ven Large (2011), Born 2 Groove (2006), Livin' Large (2004) and Play Date (2002). He has recently released another album, titled "Sunday Morning."  In 2008 he went on tour with Tina Turner.

Discography

References

External links
Official Website

1962 births
Living people
American jazz saxophonists
American male saxophonists
Narada Productions artists
Smooth jazz saxophonists
Tower of Power members
University of Miami Frost School of Music alumni
People from Hagerstown, Maryland
21st-century American saxophonists
Jazz musicians from Maryland
21st-century American male musicians
American male jazz musicians